The Craving is the debut and only album by American rock band MD.45, released on July 23, 1996, on Slab Records, a subsidiary of Capitol Records. A remastered version was released in 2004 on Capitol Records which features the original vocals by Lee Ving removed and re-recorded by the band's guitarist, Dave Mustaine, due to Capitol losing the original vocal tracks.

Mustaine has stated that he replaced Ving's original vocal tracks "to entice interest from Megadeth fans who might have overlooked the original."

The Craving did well considering there was no budget money for the promotion of the album, selling 35,000 copies first week. The album, as of 2014, has sold nearly 300,000 copies with the remix/remaster selling an additional 100,000 copies.

Track listing

Personnel
Original release
 Lee Ving – vocals, harmonica
 Dave Mustaine – guitar
 Kelly LeMieux – bass
 Jimmy DeGrasso – drums

2004 remix and remaster
 Dave Mustaine – vocals, guitar
 Kelly LeMieux – bass
 Jimmy DeGrasso – drums
Megadeth (performs only on "The Creed" (Megadeth Demo))
 Dave Mustaine – vocals, guitar
 Marty Friedman – guitar
 Dave Ellefson – bass
 Nick Menza – drums

Production
 Produced by Dave Mustaine
 Recorded by Billy Moss, assisted by Aaron Carey
 Mixed and vocals recorded by Max Norman and Dave Mustaine, assisted by Mike Tacci and Laurence Jacobson
 Mastered by Wally Traugott

2004 remix and remaster
Produced by Dave Mustaine
Mixed by Ralph Patlan and Dave Mustaine
Engineered by Ralph Patlan, assisted by Lance Dean
Edited by Lance Dean and Scott "Sarge" Harrison, assisted by Bo Caldwell and Dave McRobb
Mastered by Tom Baker

References

1996 debut albums